Gary Alan Hebl (born May 15, 1951) is an American lawyer, businessman, and Democratic politician from Dane County, Wisconsin.  He was a member of the Wisconsin State Assembly for 18 years, representing the 46th Assembly district from 2005 through 2022.

Biography

Born in Madison, Wisconsin, Hebl received his bachelor's degree from University of Wisconsin–Madison and his Juris Doctor degree from Gonzaga University School of Law. He practiced law and owned an insurance business.

References

External links
Wisconsin Assembly - Representative Gary Heblofficial government website
 
 Follow the Money - Gary Hebl
2008 2006 2004 campaign contributions

1951 births
Living people
Politicians from Madison, Wisconsin
University of Wisconsin–Madison alumni
Gonzaga University School of Law alumni
Wisconsin lawyers
Businesspeople from Madison, Wisconsin
21st-century American politicians
Lawyers from Madison, Wisconsin
People from Sun Prairie, Wisconsin
Democratic Party members of the Wisconsin State Assembly